Winibian Judit Peralta Pérez (born 19 March 1997) is a Dominican footballer who plays as a midfielder for Bob Soccer FC and the Dominican Republic women's national team.

References

External links 
 

1997 births
Living people
Dominican Republic women's footballers
Women's association football midfielders
Dominican Republic women's international footballers
Competitors at the 2014 Central American and Caribbean Games